The following is a list of daily business newspapers, divided by country and region.

International
Financial Times
The Wall Street Journal

Top circulation

Nihon Keizai Shimbun, Japan - 4,635,000
Financial Times, United Kingdom - 2,205,000
The Wall Street Journal, United States - 2,107,000
The Economist, United Kingdom - 1,600,000
The Economic Times, India - 805,940 
Il Sole 24 Ore, Italy - 334,076
Mint, India - 226,000
Business Standard, India - 217,000
Handelsblatt, Germany - 148,319
Les Échos, France - 120,546
The Australian Financial Review, Australia - 64,861

Afghanistan

Algeria

Argentina

Australia

Austria

Bahrain

Bangladesh

Barbados

Belarus

Belorusy i rynok

Belgium

Bosnia and Herzegovina

Brazil

Bulgaria

Burma (Myanmar)

Canada

Chile

China, People's Republic of

Cuba

Czech Republic

Hospodářské noviny
E15

Denmark

Egypt

Estonia
Äripäev (Business Day)

Finland

Kauppalehti (Business Newspaper)

France

Le Nouvel Économiste (with an arrangement for article-sharing with Financial Times, London and The Economist.)

Les Échos

Germany

Handelsblatt

Greece and Cyprus

Guatemala

Hong Kong 

Hong Kong Economic Journal
Hong Kong Economic Times
South China Morning Post
The Standard

Hungary

India

Business Standard
The Economic Times
Financial Chronicle
Financial Express
The Hindu Business Line
Mint

Indonesia

Bisnis Indonesia
Investor Daily
Kontan

Iran

Donya-e-Eqtesad
Financial Tribune
Tejarat-e-Farda

Ireland

The Sunday Business Post

Israel

Globes
TheMarker
ice.co.il
Calcalist

Italy

Il Sole 24 Ore
Italia Oggi
MF Milano Finanza

Japan

Nihon Keizai Shimbun

Mexico

Netherlands

Het Financieele Dagblad - 85,000

New Zealand

Norway

Dagens Næringsliv
Finansavisen

Pakistan

Peru

Philippines

 BusinessWorld
 BusinessMirror
 Chinese Commercial News
 Malaya Business Insight

Poland

Portugal

Jornal de Negócios

Romania

 Bursa
Ziarul financiar

Russia
Kommersant
The Moscow Times
RBC Daily
Vedomosti

Serbia

Poslovni dnevnik

Singapore

Business Times

Slovenia

South Africa

Business Day

Spain

 Expansión
 Cinco Días

Sri Lanka

Sweden

 Dagens Industri

Switzerland

Taiwan

Thailand

Trinidad and Tobago

Turkey

Ukraine

Delovaya Stolitsa

United Arab Emirates 

 Arabian Business
 Business24-7

 Gulf Business
 Zawya

United Kingdom

City A.M.
The Economist
Financial Times

United States

American City Business Journals
Crain's Chicago Business
Finance & Commerce
Inside Business
Investor's Business Daily
The Journal of Commerce
Miami Today
The Wall Street Journal

Venezuela

References

External links
Newspaper index
Business Finance Newspapers
The Business Times
The Economic Revolution
Financial Newspapers India

Business newspapers

Newspapers